Jonáš Forejtek and Michael Vrbenský were the defending champions but lost in the first round to Tallon Griekspoor and Bart Stevens.

Roman Jebavý and Igor Zelenay won the title after defeating Geoffrey Blancaneaux and Maxime Janvier 6–2, 6–7(6–8), [10–5] in the final.

Seeds

Draw

References

External links
 Main draw

Svijany Open - Doubles
2021 Doubles